The whale shark (Rhincodon typus) is a slow-moving, filter-feeding carpet shark and the largest known extant fish species. The whale shark holds many records for size in the animal kingdom, most notably being by far the largest living nonmammalian vertebrate. It is the sole member of the genus Rhincodon and the only extant member of the family Rhincodontidae, which belongs to the subclass Elasmobranchii in the class Chondrichthyes. Before 1984 it was classified as Rhiniodon into Rhinodontidae.

The whale shark is found in open waters of the tropical oceans and is rarely found in water below . Studies looking at vertebral growth bands and the growth rates of free-swimming sharks have estimated whale shark lifespans at 80–130 years. Whale sharks have very large mouths and are filter feeders, which is a feeding mode that occurs in only two other sharks, the megamouth shark and the basking shark. They feed almost exclusively on plankton and small fishes, and pose no threat to humans.

The species was distinguished in April 1828 after the harpooning of a  specimen in Table Bay, South Africa. Andrew Smith, a military doctor associated with British troops stationed in Cape Town, described it the following year. The name "whale shark" refers to the fish's size: it is as large as some species of whale. In addition, its filter feeding habits are not unlike those of baleen whales.

Description
Whale shark mouths can contain over 300 rows of tiny teeth and 20 filter pads which it uses to filter feed. Unlike many other sharks, whale sharks' mouths are located at the front of the head rather than on the underside of the head. The head is wide and flat with two small eyes at the front corners. The spiracles are located just behind the eyes. Whale sharks have five large pairs of gills. Their skin is dark grey with a white belly marked with pale grey or white spots and stripes which are unique to each individual. Its skin can be up to 15 cm thick and is very hard and rough to the touch. The whale shark has three prominent ridges along its sides, which start above and behind the head and end at the caudal peduncle. The shark has two dorsal fins set relatively far back on the body, a pair of pectoral fins, a pair of pelvic fins and a single medial anal fin. The tail has a larger upper lobe than the lower lobe (heterocercal).

Whale sharks were found to possess dermal denticles on the surface of their eyeballs which are structured differently from their body denticles. These denticles serve to protect the eye from damage, along with the whale shark's ability to retract its eye deep into its socket.

The complete and annotated genome of the whale shark was published in 2017.

Evidence suggests that whale sharks can recover from major injuries and may be able to regenerate small sections of their fins. Their spot markings have also been shown to reform over a previously wounded area.

Size 
The whale shark is the largest non-cetacean animal in the world. Evidence suggests that whale sharks exhibit sexual dimorphism with regards to size, with males not growing as large as females. A study looked at the growth of whale shark individuals over 10 years. It concluded that males on average reach 8 to 9 meters (26 to 30 ft) in length; although this does not represent the maximum possible size. The maximum length of the species is uncertain due to a lack of detailed documentation of the largest reported individuals. Several whale sharks around 18 m (59 ft) in length have been reported.

Large whale sharks are difficult to measure accurately, both on the land and in the water. When measured on land, the total length can be affected by how the tail is positioned, either angled as it would be in life or stretched to the maximum possible. Historically, techniques such as comparisons to objects of known size and knotted ropes have been used for in-water measurements and may suffer from inaccuracy. In 2011, laser photogrammetry was proposed to improve in-water measurement accuracy.

Reports of large individuals 
Since the 1800s, there have been accounts of very large whale sharks; some of these are as follows.

In 1868, the Irish natural scientist Edward Perceval Wright obtained several small whale shark specimens in the Seychelles. Wright was informed of one whale shark that was measured as exceeding .

Hugh M. Smith described a huge animal caught in a bamboo fish trap in Thailand in 1919. The shark was too heavy to pull ashore, and no measurements were taken. Smith learned through independent sources that it was at least 10 wa (a Thai unit of length measuring between a person's outstretched arms).

Scott A. Eckert & Brent S. Stewart reported on satellite tracking of whale sharks from between 1994 and 1996. In a 2015 study looking into the size of marine megafauna, McClain and colleagues considered this female as being the most reliable and accurately measured.

Distribution and habitat
The whale shark inhabits all tropical and warm-temperate seas. The fish is primarily pelagic, and can be found in both coastal and oceanic habitats. Tracking devices have shown that the whale shark displays dynamic patterns of habitat utilization, likely in response to availability of prey. Whale sharks observed off the northeast Yucatan Peninsula tend to engage in inshore surface swimming between sunrise and mid-afternoon, followed by regular vertical oscillations in oceanic waters during the afternoon and overnight. About 95% of the oscillating period was spent in epipelagic depths (<), but whale sharks also took regular deep dives (>), often descending in brief "stutter steps", perhaps for foraging.

The whale shark is migratory and has two distinct subpopulations: an Atlantic subpopulation, from Maine and the Azores to Cape Agulhas, South Africa, and an Indo-Pacific subpopulation which holds 75% of the entire whale shark population. It usually roams between 30°N and 35°S where water temperatures are higher than  but have been spotted as far north as the Bay of Fundy, Canada and the Sea of Okhotsk north of Japan and as far south as Victoria, Australia.

Seasonal feeding aggregations occur at several coastal sites such as the Persian Gulf and Gulf of Oman, Ningaloo Reef in Western Australia, Darwin Island in the Galápagos, Quintana Roo in Mexico, Mafia Island of Pwani Region in Tanzania, Inhambane province in Mozambique, the Philippines, around Mahe in the Seychelles, the Gujarat and Kerala coasts of India, Taiwan, southern China and Qatar.

In 2011, more than 400 whale sharks gathered off the Yucatan Coast. It was one of the largest gatherings of whale sharks recorded.  Aggregations in that area are among the most reliable seasonal gatherings known for whale sharks, with large numbers occurring in most years between May and September.  Associated ecotourism has grown rapidly to unsustainable levels.

Growth and reproduction
Growth, longevity, and reproduction of the whale shark are poorly understood. There was uncertainty as to whether vertebrae growth bands are formed annually or biannually, which is important in determining the age, growth, and longevity of whale sharks. A 2020 study compared the ratio of Carbon-14 isotopes found in growth bands of whale shark vertebrae to nuclear testing events in the 1950-60s, finding that growth bands are laid down annually. The study found an age of 50 years for a  female and 35 years for a 9.9m male. Various studies looking at vertebrae growth bands and measuring whale sharks in the wild have estimated their lifespans from ~80 years and up to ~130 years.

Evidence suggests that males grow faster than females in the earlier stages of life but ultimately reach a smaller maximum size. Whale sharks exhibit late sexual maturity. One study looking at free-swimming whale sharks estimated the age at maturity in males at ~25 years.

Pupping of whale sharks has not been observed, but mating has been witnessed twice in St Helena. Mating in this species was filmed for the first time in whale sharks off Ningaloo Reef via airplane in Australia in 2019, when a larger male unsuccessfully attempted to mate with a smaller, immature female.

The capture of a ~ female in July 1996 that was pregnant with ~300 pups indicated that whale sharks are ovoviviparous. Evidence indicates the pups are not all born at once, but rather the female retains sperm from one mating and produces a steady stream of pups over a prolonged period.

On 7 March 2009, marine scientists in the Philippines discovered what is believed to be the smallest living specimen of the whale shark. The young shark, measuring only , was found with its tail tied to a stake at a beach in Pilar, Sorsogon, Philippines, and was released into the wild. Based on this discovery, some scientists no longer believe this area is just a feeding ground; this site may be a birthing ground, as well.  Both young whale sharks and pregnant females have been seen in the waters of St Helena in the South Atlantic Ocean, where numerous whale sharks can be spotted during the summer.

In a report from Rappler last August 2019, whale sharks were sighted during WWF Philippines’ photo identification activities in the first half of the year. There were a total 168 sightings – 64 of them “re-sightings” or reappearances of previously recorded whale sharks. WWF noted that “very young whale shark juveniles" were identified among the 168 individuals spotted in the first half of 2019. Their presence suggests that the Ticao Pass may be a pupping ground for whale sharks, further increasing the ecological significance of the area.

Diet

The whale shark is a filter feeder – one of only three known filter-feeding shark species (along with the basking shark and the megamouth shark). It feeds on plankton including copepods, krill, fish eggs, Christmas Island red crab larvae  and small nektonic life, such as small squid or fish. It also feeds on clouds of eggs during mass spawning of fish and corals. The many rows of vestigial teeth play no role in feeding. Feeding occurs either by ram filtration, in which the animal opens its mouth and swims forward, pushing water and food into the mouth, or by active suction feeding, in which the animal opens and closes its mouth, sucking in volumes of water that are then expelled through the gills.  In both cases, the filter pads serve to separate food from water. These unique, black sieve-like structures are presumed to be modified gill rakers. Food separation in whale sharks is by cross-flow filtration, in which the water travels nearly parallel to the filter pad surface, not perpendicularly through it, before passing to the outside, while denser food particles continue to the back of the throat. This is an extremely efficient filtration method that minimizes fouling of the filter pad surface. Whale sharks have been observed "coughing", presumably to clear a build-up of particles from the filter pads. Whale sharks migrate to feed and possibly to breed.

The whale shark is an active feeder, targeting concentrations of plankton or fish. It is able to ram filter feed or can gulp in a stationary position. This is in contrast to the passive feeding basking shark, which does not pump water. Instead, it swims to force water across its gills.

A juvenile whale shark is estimated to eat 21 kg (46 pounds) of plankton per day.

The BBC program Planet Earth filmed a whale shark feeding on a school of small fish. The same documentary showed footage of a whale shark timing its arrival to coincide with the mass spawning of fish shoals and feeding on the resultant clouds of eggs and sperm.

Whale sharks are known to prey on a range of planktonic and small nektonic organisms that are spatiotemporally patchy. These include krill, crab larvae, jellyfish, sardines, anchovies, mackerels, small tunas, and squid. In ram filter feeding, the fish swims forward at constant speed with its mouth fully open, straining prey particles from the water by forward propulsion. This is also called  ‘passive feeding’, which usually occurs when prey is present at low density.

Due their mode of feeding, whale sharks are susceptible to the ingestion of microplastics. As such, the presence of microplastics in whale shark scat was recently confirmed.

Relationship with humans

Behavior toward divers

Despite its size, the whale shark does not pose any danger to humans. Whale sharks are docile fish and sometimes allow swimmers to catch a ride, although this practice is discouraged by shark scientists and conservationists because of the disturbance to the sharks. Younger whale sharks are gentle and can play with divers. Underwater photographers such as Fiona Ayerst have photographed them swimming close to humans without any danger.

The shark is seen by divers in many places, including the Bay Islands in Honduras, Thailand, Indonesia (Bone Bolango, Cendrawasih Bay), the Philippines, the Maldives close to Maamigili (South Ari Atoll), the Red Sea, Western Australia (Ningaloo Reef, Christmas Island), Taiwan, Panama (Coiba Island), Belize, Tofo Beach in Mozambique, Sodwana Bay (Greater St. Lucia Wetland Park) in South Africa, the Galapagos Islands, Saint Helena, Isla Mujeres  (Caribbean Sea), La Paz, Baja California Sur and Bahía de los Ángeles in Mexico, the Seychelles, West Malaysia, islands off eastern peninsular Malaysia, India, Sri Lanka, Oman, Fujairah, Puerto Rico, and other parts of the Caribbean.  Juveniles can be found near the shore in the Gulf of Tadjoura, near Djibouti, in the Horn of Africa.

Conservation status
There is currently no robust estimate of the global whale shark population. The species is considered endangered by the IUCN due to the impacts of fisheries, by-catch losses, and vessel strikes, combined with its long lifespan and late maturation. In June 2018 the New Zealand Department of Conservation classified the whale shark as "Migrant" with the qualifier "Secure Overseas" under the New Zealand Threat Classification System.

It is listed, along with six other species of sharks, under the CMS Memorandum of Understanding on the Conservation of Migratory Sharks. In 1998, the Philippines banned all fishing, selling, importing, and exporting of whale sharks for commercial purposes, followed by India in May 2001, and Taiwan in May 2007.

Sightings confirmed that the whale sharks were unable to avoid the oil slick, which was situated on the surface of the sea where the whale sharks feed for several hours at a time. No dead whale sharks were found.

This species was also added to Appendix II of the Convention on International Trade in Endangered Species of Wild Fauna and Flora (CITES) in 2003 to regulate the international trade of live specimens and its parts.

Hundreds of whale sharks are illegally killed every year in China for their fins, skins, and oil.

In captivity

The whale shark is popular in the few public aquariums that keep it, but its large size means that a very large tank is required and it has specialized feeding requirements. Their large size and iconic status have also fueled an opposition to keeping the species in captivity, especially after the early death of some whale sharks in captivity and certain Chinese aquariums keeping the species in relatively small tanks.

The first attempt at keeping whale sharks in captivity was in 1934 when an individual was kept for about four months in a netted-off natural bay in Izu, Japan. The first attempt of keeping whale sharks in an aquarium was initiated in 1980 by the Okinawa Churaumi Aquarium (then known as Okinawa Ocean Expo Aquarium) in Japan. Since 1980, several have been kept at Okinawa, mostly obtained from incidental catches in coastal nets set by fishers (none after 2009), but two were strandings. Several of these were already weak from the capture/stranding and some were released, but initial captive survival rates were low. After the initial difficulties in maintaining the species had been resolved, some have survived long-term in captivity. The record for a whale shark in captivity is an individual that, as of 2021, has lived for more than 26 years in the Okinawa Churaumi Aquarium from Okinawa Ocean Expo Aquarium. Following Okinawa, Osaka Aquarium started keeping whale sharks and most of the basic research on the keeping of the species was made at these two institutions.

Since the mid-1990s, several other aquariums have kept the species in Japan (Kagoshima Aquarium, Kinosaki Marine World, Notojima Aquarium, Oita Ecological Aquarium, and Yokohama Hakkeijima Sea Paradise), South Korea (Aqua Planet Jeju), China (Chimelong Ocean Kingdom, Dalian Aquarium, Guangzhou Aquarium in Guangzhou Zoo, Qingdao Polar Ocean World and Yantai Aquarium), Taiwan (National Museum of Marine Biology and Aquarium), India (Thiruvananthapuram Aquarium) and Dubai (Atlantis, The Palm), with some maintaining whale sharks for years and others only for a very short period. The whale shark kept at Dubai's Atlantis, The Palm was rescued from shallow waters in 2008 with extensive abrasions to the fins and after rehabilitation it was released in 2010, having lived 19 months in captivity. Marine Life Park in Singapore had planned on keeping whale sharks, but scrapped this idea in 2009.

Outside Asia, the first and so far only place to keep whale sharks is Georgia Aquarium in Atlanta, United States. This is unusual because of the comparatively long transport time and complex logistics required to bring the sharks to the aquarium, ranging between 28 and 36 hours. Georgia keeps two whale sharks: two males, Taroko and Yushan, who both arrived in 2007. Two earlier males at Georgia Aquarium, Ralph and Norton, both died in 2007. Trixie died in 2020. Alice died in 2021. Georgia's whale sharks were all imported from Taiwan and were taken from the commercial fishing quota for the species, usually used locally for food. Taiwan closed this fishery entirely in 2008.

Human culture

In Madagascar, whale sharks are called  in Malagasy, meaning "many stars", after the appearance of the markings on the shark's back.

The whale shark is featured on the reverse of the Philippine 100-peso bill.

The whale shark is also featured on the latest 2015–2017 edition of the Maldivian 1000 rufiyaa banknote, along with the green turtle.

See also

 List of sharks
 List of threatened sharks

References

Further reading 

 
 FAO web page on Whale shark

External links

 Whale Shark Photograph-identification Library
 Whale Shark And Oceanic Research Center
 Maldives Whale Shark Research Program
 Whale Sharks: Gentle Giants of the Seas
  Foundation for the Protection of Marine Megafauna
 
 Whale Shark Fact Sheet, Fisheries Western Australia
 Albino whale shark photographed in Galapagos
 Photographs National Geographic
 A whale shark recorded defecating
 

 
Ovoviviparous fish
Pantropical fish
whale shark
Apex predators
Fish of North America
Fish of Central America
Fish of Australia
Fish of Asia
Fish of Africa
Extant Oligocene first appearances
Articles containing video clips
Taxa named by Andrew Smith (zoologist)